Mesotrophe alienaria is a moth in the family Geometridae. It is found on Borneo, Peninsular Malaysia and Sumatra. The habitat consists of lowland areas.

References

Moths described in 1863
Cosymbiini